Imma flavibasa is a moth in the family Immidae. It was described by Frederic Moore in 1888. It is found in India (the eastern Himalayas, Assam).

The basal half of the forewings is deep yellow, the outer half brownish ferruginous, brightest in its middle. The hindwings and abdomen are dark brown.

References

Moths described in 1888
Immidae
Moths of Asia